This lists the singles that reached number one on the Spanish Promusicae sales and airplay charts in 2015. Total sales correspond to the data sent by regular contributors to sales volumes and by digital distributors. Beginning in January 2015, the methodology for Top 100 songs were changed to be based on streaming and both download and physical sales.

Chart history

References

Spain
 Number-one singles
2015